Lewa may refer to:

 A traditional Baluch folk dance in Pakistan
 LEWA, a manufacturer from Germany that produces diaphragm metering pumps, process pumps as well as customized metering systems and production units
 Lewa Wildlife Conservancy
 LeWa OS, a Chinese Android ROM
 Lewa, the Toa Nuva of Air (formerly Toa Mata) in the Lego Bionicle toy series
 A nickname for Polish footballer Robert Lewandowski